Capitol Airport  is a public use airport located three nautical miles (6 km) east of the central business district of Brookfield, a city in Waukesha County, Wisconsin, United States. It is privately owned by Wisconsin Aviation Investments LLC. The airport is also known as, or formerly known as, Capitol Drive Airport.

It is included in the Federal Aviation Administration (FAA) National Plan of Integrated Airport Systems for 2023–2027, in which it is categorized as a regional reliever airport facility.

Facilities and aircraft 
It has one asphalt paved runway designated 3/21 which measures 2,994 x 45 ft. (913 x 13 m), plus two turf runways: 9/27 measuring 3,387 x 100 ft. (1,033 x 30 m) and 18/36 measuring 1,602 x 80 ft. (488 x 24 m).

The facility has no published instrument procedures and no instrument navigational aids.

For the 12-month period ending July 22, 2022, the airport had 13,010 aircraft operations, an average of 36 per day: 99% general aviation and less than 1% military. In January 2023, there were 100 aircraft based at this airport: 93 single-engine, 2 multi-engine and 5 helicopter.

Brookfield Aero, LLC is the fixed-base operator.

Incidents
A groundskeeper was seriously injured when he was struck by the propeller of a Cessna 120 taxiing prior to takeoff on September 6, 2002.
Two were killed on November 21, 1992, when their Piper PA-28-140 crashed while attempting to land in low visibility.
One was killed and two were injured on January 4, 2017, when their plane crashed during takeoff.

See also 
 List of airports in Wisconsin

References

External links 
http://www.capitoldriveairport.com/
 from the Wisconsin DOT Airport Directory

Airports in Wisconsin
Buildings and structures in Waukesha County, Wisconsin